Sheshtanrud-e Bala (also Romanized as Sheştānrūd-e Bālā) is a village in Lat Leyl Rural District, Otaqvar District, Langarud County, Gilan Province, Iran. At the 2006 census, its population was 79, in 20 families.

References 

Populated places in Langarud County